Serviço Federal de Processamento de Dados (Federal Data Processing Service), or Serpro, is the biggest government-owned corporation of IT services of Brazil. It was created by Law n. 4.516, of December 1, 1964 to modernize and give agility to strategic sectors of public administration. It's a company linked to the Ministry of the Economy of Brazil and it grown developing software and services to let more control and transparency about government revenue and government spending.

References

External links 
 

Business services companies established in 1964
Companies based in Brasília
Software companies of Brazil
Government-owned companies of Brazil